The Lechința is a left tributary of the river Dipșa in Romania. It discharges into the Dipșa near the village Lechința.

References

Rivers of Romania
Rivers of Bistrița-Năsăud County